XHSPP-FM is a radio station on 102.3 FM in San Pedro Pochutla, Oaxaca. It is known as La Voz del Pacífico Sur.

History
XHSPP received its concession on April 3, 1995. It was owned by Raúl Martínez Ostos y Martínez de Castro and sold in 2009 to Radio Pochutla.

References

Radio stations in Oaxaca